Benefit of the Doubt is a 1993 English-language German thriller film directed by Jonathan Heap and starring Donald Sutherland and Amy Irving.

It was released on July 16, 1993 in the United States by Miramax Films, marking the first film to be released after being acquired by The Walt Disney Company.

Plot 
Karen, a life-weary single-mother and waitress finds her life disrupted when her father, Frank, is finally released after 20 years in the State Pen. It was she who provided the key testimony that had him convicted of uxoricide. She still believes he did it, but is unable to remember the exact details of the traumatic event. This thriller chronicles the events that follow her father's return.

First of all he begins ingratiating himself with her young son and her lover. Angered, she confronts him, but finds him too persuasively charming to stay angry. He then convinces her that her memory is faulty and that her mother died accidentally. She believes him and accepts him back. The tale takes a much darker turn, when her father begins isolating her from her friends and dominating her life. It is soon after she announces her intent to marry Dan that a new string of killings begin. Around that time certain events trigger Karen's dormant memories and she realizes that she knows the truth about her father.

Cast 
 Donald Sutherland as Frank
 Amy Irving as Karen Braswell
 Rider Strong as Pete Braswell
 Christopher McDonald as Dan
 Graham Greene as Calhoun
 Theodore Bikel as Gideon Lee
 Gisela Kovach as Suzanna
 Ferdy Mayne as Mueller
 Julie Hasel as Young Karen
 Patricia Tallman as Karen's mother
 Ralph McTurk as Trooper
 Shane McCabe as Wayland
 Margaret Johnson as Waitress
 Heinrich James as Marina Guard

Production
Parts of the film were shot at Glen Canyon in Utah as well as Camp Verde, Clarkdale, Cottonwood and Sedona in Arizona.

References

External links 
 
 

1993 films
1993 thriller films
American thriller films
German thriller films
English-language German films
Films about dysfunctional families
Films shot in Utah
Films shot in Arizona
Miramax films
Films scored by Hummie Mann
1990s English-language films
Uxoricide in fiction
CineVox films
1990s American films
1990s German films